The ARM Cortex-A34 a low power central processing unit implementing the ARMv8-A 64-bit instruction set designed by ARM Ltd.

Licensing 
The Cortex-A34 is available as a SIP core to licensees whilst its design makes it suitable for integration with other SIP cores (e.g. GPU, display controller, DSP, image processor, etc.) into one die constituting a system on a chip (SoC).

Technical

See also 

 Comparison of ARMv8-A cores, ARMv8 family
Comparison of ARMv7-A cores, ARMv7 family

References

ARM processors